Aay Preston-Myint (born 1981) is a visual artist and art educator. He is based in Oakland, California.

About 
Aay Preston-Myint was born in 1981 in New York City, New York. He has worked extensively in Chicago, Illinois, and is a co-founder of the Chicago Art Book Fair. The Chicago Art Book Fair has been held annually since 2017 and emerged from the No Coast publishing imprint. Preston-Myint was a professor at the School of the Art Institute of Chicago; and he is a program manager at the Headlands Center for the Arts in Sausalito, California.

He founded Chances Dances, a party that "supports and showcases the work of queer artists in Chicago."

Exhibitions
Aay Preston-Myint's solo exhibitions include At Night, I Think of You, held at the Threewalls Gallery in Chicago in 2013; Project #11, and held in 2018 at the 'sindikit gallery in Baltimore, Maryland in 2018. He had two solo exhibitions shows in 2019: Wormhole at Adler & Floyd in Chicago and X O at the Royal Nonesuch Gallery in Oakland, California.

References

1981 births
Living people
20th-century American artists
21st-century American artists
African-American contemporary artists
School of the Art Institute of Chicago alumni
American gay artists
American contemporary artists
Artists from New York City
Artists from Oakland, California
20th-century African-American artists
21st-century African-American artists
21st-century American LGBT people